O Ses Türkiye is a Turkish reality singing competition and local version of The Voice. It started on October 10, 2011. O Ses Türkiye is presented by Acun Ilıcalı (since 2011).

One of the important premises of the show is the quality of singing. Four coaches, themselves popular performing artists, train the contestants in their groups and occasionally perform with them. Talents are selected in blind auditions, where the coaches cannot see, but only hear the contestants.

Selection process and format
O Ses Türkiye consists of four judges and a presenter. The competition includes five rounds in total.

The coaches' chairs are faced towards the audience during artists' performances; those interested in an artist press their button, which turns their chair towards the artist and illuminates the bottom of the chair to read "O ses sensin" (You're that voice). After the performance, an artist either defaults to the only coach who turned around or selects his or her coach if more than one coach expresses interest.

The second round is called "Duel". Each coach pairs two of his or her team members to perform together, and then chooses one to advance in the competition.

If the contestants are chosen for the 3rd round of the competition, they will be eligible to move to the next round and their performances will be broadcast live. In this round, each team's remaining contestants will compete against three or four competitors every week. After the live performances of the competitors, the results will be determined through the SMS votes. In each team, the person with the most votes is eligible to contest in the following week. The fate of the last two remaining contestants will be determined by the judges. The judges' votes give one of the competitors the right to contest at the next level. This round continues until the remaining two people from each team are determined.

In the semi-final round, a total of two contestants from each team will compete in eight phases. After contestants sang their songs, the judges score their performances. The results of SMS voting will be added to the judges' score and the ones who reach 100 points will be eligible to compete in the final round.

In the final round, the remaining four contestants compete against each other. After the elimination of the fourth one, the remaining contestants will sing their songs again, and the third place will be decided according to the results of a new SMS voting. The final phase is between the two competitors whose performances will be rated through the votes, and as a result, the competitor with the most votes in the contest will become the champion of O Ses Türkiye, and his/her judge's team will be chosen as the champion team.

Series overview

 Team Mustafa
 Team Hadise
 Team Murat
 Team Hülya
 Team Gökhan
 Team Ebru
 Team Gökhan & Hakan
 Team Sibel
 Team Yıldız
 Team Beyazıt
 Team Seda
 Team Oğuzhan

Coaches

Season synopses

  Winner coach
  Runner-up
  Third place
  Fourth place

Winners are in bold, eliminated artists in smaller font. Final contestants listed first.

O Ses Çocuklar
O Ses Çocuklar was the Turkish version of The Voice Kids, designed for children of age from 7 to 14 years old. O Ses Çocuklar shares the same format with the adult version O Ses Türkiye but has some differences. In the midst of preparations for the 2016 edition, it was reported that RTÜK threatened to cancel the series, stating that the format "contains content that could harm the physical, mental, or moral development of children".

Coaches' timeline

Coaches and their finalists
  – Winning Coach/Contestant. Winners are in bold, eliminated contestants in small font. 
  – Runner-Up Coach/Contestant. Final contestant first listed.
  – Third Place Coach/Contestant. Final contestant first listed.
  – Fourth Place Coach/Contestant. Final contestant first listed.

Series overview

 Team Hadise
 Team Murat Boz
 Team Mustafa Ceceli
 Team Oğuzhan Koç
 Team Burak Kut

O Ses Türkiye Rap 
  Team Eypio
  Team Hadise
  Team Mero
  Team Murda

O Ses Turkiye Christmas Special

References

External links
 Official website

Turkey
Turkish reality television series
2011 Turkish television series debuts
Show TV original programming
Star TV (Turkey) original programming
TV8 (Turkish TV channel) original programming